Calolampra is a genus of cockroaches in the family Blaberidae.

Species
The genus includes the following species:

 Calolampra aspera
 Calolampra atra
 Calolampra candidula
 Calolampra characterosa
 Calolampra confusa
 Calolampra darlingtoni
 Calolampra depolita
 Calolampra elegans 
 Calolampra fenestrata
 Calolampra fraserensis
 Calolampra ignota
 Calolampra indonesica
 Calolampra insularis
 Calolampra irrorata
 Calolampra malaisei
 Calolampra marginalis
 Calolampra mjoebergi
 Calolampra nitida
 Calolampra obscura
 Calolampra paula
 Calolampra pernotabilis
 Calolampra propinqua
 Calolampra punctosa
 Calolampra queenslandica
 Calolampra signatura
 Calolampra solida
 Calolampra subgracilis
 Calolampra submarginalis
 Calolampra tepperi
 Calolampra truncata

References

External links

 Calolampra at uniprot.org
 

Cockroach genera